ADB-FUBIATA (AD-18, FUB-ACADB, ADB-FUBIACA) is a synthetic cannabinoid compound first identified in 2021. It is closely related in structure to the older compound ADB-FUBICA but with the amide linker group extended by the addition of a methylene bridge. It started to be sold as an ingedient in grey-market synthetic cannabis blends following the introduction of legislation in China which for the first time introduced general controls on various classes of synthetic cannabinoids, but did not encompass compounds where the linker group had been extended in this fashion. ADB-FUBIATA has many times lower affinity for cannabinoid receptors than ADB-FUBICA with an EC50 of only 635 nM at CB1, but retains full agonist activity at this target, while being practically inactive at CB2.

References 

Cannabinoids
Indoles
Fluoroarenes
Amides
Carboxamides